The Paul G. Allen Frontiers Group is a bioscience research initiative started in 2016 funded with an initial investment of $100 million. Its new vision is to identify areas in bioscience that are ripe for a major breakthrough, and then fund specific investigators to pursue advances.

References

American companies established in 2016
Biotechnology companies of the United States